Itihaas is an Indian drama series created by Nirmala Sood and co-produced by Ekta Kapoor and Shobha Kapoor under their banner Balaji Telefilms. The series premiered in 1996 on DD National.

Plot
Ambika is the princess of a royal family who seeks justice for her husband's death. The series revolves around two generations of the royal family and explores greed, dishonesty and murder that often ensue for the throne. How Ambika succeeds in her crusade against all odds forms the crux of the story.

Cast 

 Joan David
 Priya Tendulkar
 Prabha Sinha
 Smita Bansal as Padmini
 Poonam Narula as Mona
 Ali Asgar as Mukul
 Arun Bali
 Benjamin Gilani
 Savita Prabhune
 Nandita Puri
 Lalit Tiwari
 Pratima Kazmi
Shishir Sharma
Anupam Shyam
 Vineet Kumar

References

External links 
 
 Official Website

Balaji Telefilms television series
DD National original programming
Indian television soap operas
1996 Indian television series debuts